Ralph Edelhäußer (born 22 March 1973) is a German politician for the CSU and since 2021 member of the Bundestag, the federal diet.

Life and politics 
Edelhäußer was born in 1973 in the West German town of Roth and was elected directly to the Bundestag in 2021.

References 

Living people
1973 births
Members of the Bundestag 2021–2025
21st-century German politicians
Christian Social Union in Bavaria politicians